Able Edwards is a 2004 science fiction film directed by Graham Robertson and starring Scott Kelly Galbreath, Keri Bruno, David Ury, Steve Beaumont Jones, and Michael Shamus Wiles. Able Edwards follows the clone of a Walt Disneyesque entertainment mogul created to revive the glory days of his deceased predecessor's corporation. In the process of restoring reality entertainment to a synthetic, virtual world, the clone realizes he has yet to live as his own man.

Plot
In the not so distant future, the world is faced with a global catastrophe. A biological contaminant is released into the atmosphere and over the following years, decimates nearly ninety percent of the world's population. Fleeing the poisoned planet, humanity relocates to a space station orbiting the Earth. It is there that life continues with the hope of one day returning to Earth.

The film unfolds during the probate hearing determining the disposition of assets of the estate of Abel Edwards beta, the clone of the founder of the Edwards Corporation (EC), the most successful entertainment conglomerate of the 20th Century. The EC included an enormously successful film and television studio and the Abel Edwards' Fantastic Wonderlands Theme Parks based on the characters populating Abel Edwards' animated films.

The EC has an extensive animatronic background and has morphed into a manufacturer whose significant product is the humanoid robot; their market share has fallen sharply and sales have softened. They understand the need to develop a new market, but after several failed attempts, recognize they lack the intuition and imagination necessary for the success of such a bold course change. As a last-ditch effort, their marketing department develops a plan to clone their dead genius founder, Abel Edwards. They will grow a genetic replica, and they will infuse him with the same life-altering experiences that shaped the original man. Nature plus nurture, or something like it.

Upon his 25th birthday, Edwards takes the reins of the company and rides a 20-year wave of success with every passing day. When the potential rival of the status quo career politician abruptly drops out of the race, Edwards sees his chance to expand beyond his defined boundaries and bring the 'Edwards Standard of Living' directly into people's living rooms, rather than maintaining a park to give them a transitory experience. When Edwards moves from a 'Celebrity Politician' to a front-running candidate, the power struggle reaches its breaking point.

The Anti-Reality Organizations finally have their scapegoat. He loses the Senate race in a landslide. Edwards has lost his son, the Senate seat and his position as CEO of the company. Edwards commandeers a space shuttle and heads for the site of the original Able Edwards Fantastic Wonderland beginning a journey of no return.

Production

Able Edwards was shot on mini DV (Canon XL-1) at a small green screen stage in Hollywood. No physical sets were used.

"I had always been intrigued with the idea of adapting old films to new settings," said director Graham Robertson. As literature has stories that have been retold with modern views, the cinema has classics that are ripe for revisiting. Able Edwards revisits the spirit and structure of Citizen Kane.

But we didn't have a lot of money to spend, so using consumer technologies and truckloads of resourcefulness, we managed to shoot the entire feature in 15 days with a budget of $30,000. The plan was this; get a green wall, get some actors, scan some photographs to use as backgrounds (sets) and shoot a "big budget" looking film for no dollars."

For starters, I spent a good chunk of time at the downtown branch of the L.A. library going through piles of architecture books; collecting and scanning the images. Elements of the existing photographs were photoshopped and composited to create new, unique environments- the futuristic world of Able Edwards. Twenty-three dollars in late fees and a month later, we had our sets."

After getting the footage in the can, I began the long process of importing the green footage and editing it. About this time, a friend told me that she had spoken to Steven Soderbergh about the project and he was interested in our process. Next thing I knew, he was at my house in my office, watching EXTREMELY rough-cut sequences and test composites. Forty-five minutes later, we had a new executive producer."

I spent the following year chained to my office chair assembling, editing and compositing the film. There were many days where I felt like Dick Van Dyke's one-man-band in Mary Poppins. It was true desktop cinema."

External links
 

2004 films
American science fiction drama films
2000s science fiction drama films
American black-and-white films
2004 directorial debut films
2004 drama films
Films scored by Michael Suby
2000s English-language films
2000s American films